Vera Zozulya (born 15 January 1956 in Talsi, Latvian SSR) is a Soviet luger who competed during the late 1970s and early 1980s. Competing in two Winter Olympics, she won the gold medal in the women's singles event at the 1980 Winter Olympics in Lake Placid, New York.

Zozulya also won a complete set of medals in the women's singles event at the FIL World Luge Championships with a gold in 1978, a silver in 1977, and a bronze in 1981.

At the FIL European Luge Championships, she won two medals in the women's singles event with a gold in 1976 and a bronze in 1978. She won the overall women's singles Luge World Cup title in 1981-2.

Zozulya later became a coach for lugers in the Soviet Union, Latvia, and Poland. She was inducted into the International Luge Federation Hall of Fame in 2006.

References

External links
Hickoksports.com results on Olympic champions in luge and skeleton.
Hickok sports information on World champions in luge and skeleton.
List of European luge champions 
List of women's singles luge World Cup champions since 1978.

1956 births
Living people
Latvian female lugers
Soviet female lugers
Lugers at the 1976 Winter Olympics
Lugers at the 1980 Winter Olympics
Lugers at the 1984 Winter Olympics
Olympic lugers of the Soviet Union
Olympic medalists in luge
People from Talsi
Medalists at the 1980 Winter Olympics
Olympic gold medalists for the Soviet Union